Lunch Meat is a 1987 American film directed by Kirk Alex.

The film is also known as Lunchmeat (American video title).

Plot summary 
Six high school seniors embark on a camping trip but are suddenly ambushed by murderous hillbillys who sell the remains of their victims to a local fast food restaurant.

Cast 
Ashlyn Gere (credited as Kim McKamy) as Roxy
Chuck Ellis as Benny
Joe Ricciardella as Frank
Elroy Wiese as Paw
Robert Oland as Harley
Mitch Rogers as Elwood
Rick Lorentz as Cary
Bob Joseph as Eddie
Marie Ruzicka as Debbie
Patricia Christie as Sue
Ann McBride as Waitress

Soundtrack 

Yerba brava - Pibe Cantina / Malagata - Y Hoy Quieres Volver /
Charly El Cumbiero - Mi Cumbia Suave

External links 

1987 films
1987 horror films
1987 drama films
American horror drama films
1980s English-language films
1980s American films